Vaisravanath Raman Namboothiri  was a Sanskrit scholar and gandhian born in the Palakad district of Kerala. He was a Sanskrit/Malayalam teacher who later on turned to a Bhagavathacharya. He was one of the main Acharyas of Bhagavatha Sathram. He has received a master's degree in science of Sanskrit debate and reasoning, Tarka sastra and is an expert in vyakaranan sidhantham.

About
Vaisravanath Raman Namboothiri was a Sanskrit scholar who has worked to translate many Sanskrit scripts to common Malayalam language. He along with many other Sanskrit scholars participated in the Guruvayur Satyagraha. The fight for entry of lower castes into temples led by main leaders like A. K. Gopalan,K. Kelappan etc. was supported by many Sanskrit scholars by a demonstration of public bhagavatha sapthaham to lower castes that too outside the temple premises. Raman namboothiri has been active participant in those sapthaha yajnams. He has translated more than 100 Sanskrit scrolls, Vedas, upanishads etc. into Malayalam language so that common man can read and understand the basics behind it. Complex theories such as Darwinism which has been mentioned in bhagavatham was translated into local Malayalam language by him. His translations have become almost extinct nowadays but in memory of his achievements, the auditorium of Ananganadi Higher Secondary School where he used to provide lectures has been renamed to Raman namboothiri smaraka mandiram. Being a Gandhiyan he was active during the post independence period in many activities even including the Salt March and has been active in many ways even at Porbandar.

References

Gandhians
People from Ottapalam
Indian Sanskrit scholars